Alois Hans Schram (20 August 1864, Vienna – 8 April 1919, Vienna) was an Austrian portrait, history and decorative painter. Much of his work is in the Art Nouveau style, although many later works may be classified as Neo-Baroque.

Biography
Alois Schram's father was a councilor for the postal service. From 1879 to 1888, he studied at the Academy of Fine Arts, Vienna. His primary instructors there were Carl Wurzinger, Hans Makart and Josef Matyáš Trenkwald.

After graduating, he was granted the Staatspreisstipendium (1890/1891), a scholarship that enabled him to continue his studies in Rome.

When Schram returned, he worked as a portrait and decorative painter in Vienna. During the 1890s, he visited several other European and Middle Eastern countries.

From 1909 to 1911, Schram created allegorical friezes in the Austrian Parliament Building. In 1915, he did a series of ceiling paintings in the ballroom of the Hofburg. Outside of Vienna, he worked at the Palazzo Vivante in Trieste and the judicial building in Salzburg. 

The proceeds from the sale of his estate were given entirely to them, as per his will, to create a fund for the promotion of aspiring artists.

Schram was interred at the Zentralfriedhof.

References

Further reading
 Biography, Österreichisches Biographisches Lexikon 1815-1950

External links

 More works by Schram on ArtNet

1864 births
1919 deaths
Artists from Vienna
Academy of Fine Arts Vienna alumni
Austrian painters
Austrian portrait painters
Austrian orientalists
Art Nouveau painters